Autostrada del Brennero may refer to:
 Autostrada A22 (Italy)
 Brenner Autobahn, Austria
 Autostrada del Brennero (company), operator of A22 in Italy